Oleh Viktorovych Kastornyi (born 29 August 1970) is a former Ukrainian professional footballer.

Club career
He made his professional debut in the Soviet Top League in 1990 for FC Metalist Kharkiv. He played 3 games and scored 1 goal in the 1998 UEFA Intertoto Cup for FC Baltika Kaliningrad.

References

1970 births
Footballers from Kharkiv
Living people
Soviet footballers
Ukrainian footballers
Association football defenders
Russian Premier League players
FC Metalist Kharkiv players
FC Shakhtar Donetsk players
FC Baltika Kaliningrad players
FC Fakel Voronezh players
FC Metallurg Lipetsk players
FC Yenisey Krasnoyarsk players